Hesperonatalius is a genus of Australian mygalomorph spiders in the family Anamidae, first described by M. A. Castalanelli, J. A. Huey, M. J. Hillyer & Mark Stephen Harvey in 2017.  it contains only three species.

References

External links

Mygalomorphae genera
Anamidae